Maorichiton is a defunct genus of chitons in the family Mopaliidae.

Species
Species within this genus included:
 Maorichiton caelatus (Reeve, 1847)
 Maorichiton schauinslandi (Thiele, 1909)
These two species are now recognized as a single species Plaxiphora caelata (Reeve, 1847)

References

Mopaliidae